Mohamed Mustapha Tabet (1949 – September 5, 1993), known by his nickname Hajj Hamid or Hajj Tabet, was a Moroccan serial rapist and former police commissioner who was allegedly involved in the kidnapping, rapes and assaults of more than 518 women in his Casablanca apartment from 1986 to 1993. The case became one of the most egregious examples of police corruption and sexual abuse in the country, as Tabet used his status to dismiss and cover-up evidence of his crimes. He was eventually be convicted and sentenced to death in March, 1993 and subsequently executed by firing squad the following September in 1993, after spending approximately 6 months on death row.

Early life and crimes  
Mohammed Mustapha Tabet was born in 1949 in Beni Mellal, Morocco. After graduating high school in 1970, he worked as an Arabic teacher before enrolling in the police academy in Khenifra in 1974. Tabet entered the Renseignements Généraux (RG), Morocco's police intelligence agency, in 1975. By 1989, he had become the head of the Casablanca bureau of the RG. 

He gained the reputation of a highly-religious man, and gained the nickname of Hajj Tabet following his pilgrimage to Mecca. According to a victim, he reportedly interrupted his rapes after hearing the call to prayer, and continued raping the woman after praying. Tabet had also gained infamy amongst locals due to the numerous complaints lodged against him, predominantly by young women and girls, that he had approached them in his car, kidnapped and raped them at his apartment. 

Rumors claimed that Tabet used his position to cover-up his crimes, and his colleagues in the police force often destroyed any evidence to prevent charges being brought against him. Tabet usually assured his victims that he could get them hymenorrhaphy the next day to "keep their virginity". 

Tabet had been married twice and had five children. It was reported by TelQuel that Tabet often had depressive episodes, and an inferiority complex. Tabet allegedly felt a need to prove his masculinity.

Arrest and investigation
In 1990, a woman and her girlfriend were reported to have filed a complaint for rape and kidnapping to local police in the Hay Mohammadi district of Casablanca against someone calling themselves "Hajj Hamid". Police found inconsistencies in her story, the women admitted that they were not kidnapped. "Hajj Hamid" allegedly told the women that the act was videotaped and promised to give them a copy by Eid al-Fitr. "Hajj Hamid" was quickly identified as Mustapha Tabet by policemen, however, it was discovered Tabet were the investigating officer's supervisors. Police officers tried to convince the women to drop charges to no avail. The women filed another complaint to a different police station, only for the complaint to get ignored.

In August 1992, a Moroccan student in Milan recognized his sister while watching a pornographic video cassette with his friends. The student went back to Casablanca the next day in search of answers, after confronting his family with the tape, he found out that the sister met someone calling themselves Hajj in 1991. Afterwards, the student found where Hajj lived, he ended up going to Hajj's apartment to meet his sister, after spotting his sister entering the house, he was quickly arrested and arbitrarily detained. The student was freed the next day, he rented a new car and "kidnapped" his sister while on his way to Hajj's house. He filmed his sister's confession and version of the story and, as an Italian citizen, the student sent the videotape to the Italian embassy, who relayed it to the Prime Minister's office. After Prime Minister Abdellatif Filali received a copy of the video, he relayed it to the king of Morocco, Hassan II. Hassan, who was planning a police reform, ordered an immediate investigation, and a secret investigation cell was opened by the Royal Gendermerie. 

On February 2, 1993, the Royal Gendarmerie, without informing the police and without a warrant, decided to raid Tabet's house. During the raid, they found and seized two remote control video cameras, two microphones hidden under the bed, identity cards of women, cocaine, 118 video tapes featuring victims having intercourse with Tabet, sometimes with other men, and a list consisting of the names and addresses of dozens of women on Tabet's computer. 

Tabet was taken into custody after four days as a fugitive for interrogation and was allegedly subject to torture and beatings. His wife and children, who lived in another house, denied any knowledge of his crimes. The Gendarmerie counted 518 victims, but speculated that the number of victims could be as high as 600-1200, including minors. The Public Prosecutor of Casablanca later described the tapes as "[...] not only pornographic recordings, but the most horrific recordings in the history of humanity", while the Moroccan press named the case "one of the worst examples of police corruption and cover-ups in the country's history". He had edited the tapes as he had filmed multiple angles of his rapes, he also created a compilation of what he considered to be the best parts of his collection, the tape was simply labeled "32". The "32" tape was alleged to contain several Moroccan notables, high-ranking officers and politicians having sex with his victims. The contents of the tape officially remain unknown. The same officers also claimed that Tabet sold some of the compilations overseas for financial profit. 

According to an indictment filed against Tabet, that was heavily publicized, he admitted to "[regularly having gone] to the gates of schools, faculties, or simply walked the main boulevards" with the sole aim of "hunting his prey". Once his victims were on board his car, he would take them directly to his apartment, where the girls gave themselves up, willingly or unwillingly, to his overflowing sexual appetite. He made no distinction between married and single women, virgins and non-virgins". He also admitted to having spent more than 5000 dirham per month on prostitutes. The indictment noted a specific incident where Tabet allegedly forced three women from the same family, a mother, her daughter, and her 15-year-old niece, to sleep with him.

Trial and conviction

On February 18, 1993, Tabet's trial started, the trial was held in camera during Ramadan, he was charged with "indecent assault, defloration, rape with violence, abduction, and sequestration of a married woman, acts of barbarism and incitement to debauchery, falsification and destruction of evidence" in front of the Criminal Chamber of the Court of Appeal in Casablanca. 

Prosecution was led by Noureddine Riahi who requested the death penalty, the judge was Lahcen Tolfi, and Tabet was represented by Mohamed Afrit Bennani. Bennani claimed that his client "is not a criminal. He is perhaps unwell. He may as well even be a sick man. He has powerful urges. He needs sex more than many men. Sometimes for four or five hours a day. For a 54-year-old man, I admit that is unusual. But that does not make him a criminal". 

The defense's strategy was to prove that Tabet was physically unable to have 518 sexual relations in 3 years and tried to portray Tabet as mentally ill and claimed he was possessed by a jinn, the jinn would be the one pushing Tabet to do the "incomprehensible acts". Tabet was deemed able to stand trial after being evaluated by a court-appointed psychiatrist. 

The trial was described by witnesses as "a hasty trial where the commissioner was constantly summoned to keep quiet". The "32" tape was not admitted as evidence and was allegedly destroyed. When a police commissioner brought up the "32" tape at Tabet's trial, it caused "indescribable panic within the court and the judge kept inevitably adjourned the session", however, Tabet insisted that the jury see the "32" tape. 

At his trial, he admitted to the authenticity of the tapes, claimed that he had intercourse with up to 1,500 women and that at least 10 of the city's supervisors and other senior police officers had aided in destroying evidence, despite this, Tabet argued that the victims were either willing participants or prostitutes. All 118 tapes that were found at the raid were screened at the courtroom except for the "32" tape. During a 6-hour long screening of one of the videos, a lawyer fainted and had to be taken to a hospital. 

The trial was highly criticized and denounced. Excerpts of the trial were broadcast by Al-Aoula, the biggest public TV channel in Morocco.

On March 15, 1993, Mustapha Tabet was found guilty on all charges and sentenced to death by firing squad, 30 other accomplices were sentenced from 5 months to 20 years in prison, Tabet's superior officer, Ahmed Ouachi, received a life sentence, he received a royal pardon in 2000. Tabet's father disowned him after the verdict. Islamic fundamentalist groups denounced the verdict, demanding death by stoning or crucifixion rather than firing squad. A march was held after the verdict denouncing sexual assault in Rabat.

Execution 
On September 5, 1993, six months after his trial, at Kenitra Central Prison, Tabet was woken up by the call to Fajr prayer. 

After praying, he was taken by Gendarmes to a car under the pretext that he'll be transferred to another detention center, instead, he was taken to a forest area, tied to a pole, a magistrate approved his execution on the spot and asked Tabet to recite the Shahada, the Islamic testimony of faith, four snipers from the Auxiliary Forces aimed their rifles at Tabet. The magistrate was rumored to have asked Tabet for any final words, Tabet replied with "I am condemned for things that everyone else does. Except that the people who were sentenced with me have nothing to do with this story!". 

Snipers shot at Tabet in rapid succession, Tabet was later declared dead. 

His family was not allowed to witness the execution. Tabet's family received his body 48 hours later in a coffin that was sealed shut, the family refused to get Tabet's body's inspected by independent medical examiners.

As of 2022, he remains the last person to executed after a death sentence in Morocco.

Legacy 
Tabet is buried in Achelh Cemetery, Casablanca. A movie directed by Nabyl Lahlou, Tabite or not Tabite, was based out of Tabet's trial. Tabet's widow, Malika Abbassi, expressed her intent to sue Lahlou. Lahlou dismissed Abbassi by saying "if [Abbassi] sues me, she will do me a great service because I will be able to go from the anonymity that has always pursued me to finally become famous".

See also
 List of serial rapists
 Tabite or not Tabite

References

1949 births
1993 deaths
Male criminals
20th-century Moroccan criminals
Moroccan people convicted of rape
Moroccan prisoners sentenced to death
20th-century executions
Executed Moroccan people
People executed by firing squad
People executed for rape
Police corruption
Violence against women in Morocco
People from Beni Mellal
People executed by Morocco